Mir Alam Ali Khan, also known as Nawab Alam Yar Jung Bahadur, was an Indian judge and politician.

Early life and education

Alam Ali Khan was the eldest son of Mir Hashim Ali Khan. Nawab Hashim Nawaz Jung, a colonel with the Hyderabad Imperial Service Troops and Nizams regular Forces received education at Madrasa-e-aliya and the Nizam College, where he obtained both a B.A. and a B C L degrees. For a short period he served as a Cadet in the Army. Later, obtained his M.A from Madras University, subsequently, he moved to England to complete his education at Oxford University's Lincoln College here he attained his barrister-at-law and returned to Hyderabad.

Civil service
Ali Khan was appointed Munsif-darj-e-awal (first session judge) for the court of Beerad and soon also became Nazim-Sardar-e-Adalat (inspecting officer) at the court of Gulbarga. For a long time he served as the inspecting officer for the courts of Andhra Pradesh, and was later appointed Nazim-e-Sardar (Chief Justice).
On 2 August 1943, Alam ali khan was conferred the title Alam yar jung, the next day on 3 August the High court remained closed, in honour to felicitate and celebrate. After his retirement from his judicial offices, he was appointed as a Judicial and religious member of HEH the Nizams Executive council wherein he held the judicial portfolio.

Family
Nawab Alam yar jung had three brothers and four sisters.  The brothers included Nawab Talib Ali Khan, Accountant General of Hyderabad, Col Subhan Ali Khan, also Barrister at law Mir Iqbal Ali Khan Barr-at-lae . The sisters included Mehdi Begum, Tahira Begum and Wazir Begum.

Further reading

References

1890 births
1970 deaths
Alumni of Lincoln College, Oxford
Salar Jung family
Indian Muslims
Recipients of the Padma Bhushan in public affairs
20th-century Indian judges
Hyderabad State politicians
Politicians from Hyderabad, India